David C. Ulich is an American film producer and attorney. He is known for producing several critically acclaimed documentaries, including Emmy-nominated At the Heart of Gold: Inside the USA Gymnastics Scandal, the Oscar-nominated short documentary End Game, and the Emmy-nominated Munich '72 and Beyond. Ulich is a partner at Sheppard Mullin Richter and Hampton, where he leads the firm's Non-Profit Sector Team.

He is also a Founder and Producer for Sidewinder Films, a production company.

Ulich was nominated for the 38th Annual News & Documentary Emmy Awards in the “Outstanding Research” category for his work on Munich ’72 and Beyond. His film At the Heart of Gold: Inside the USA Gymnastics Scandal received two nominations for the 41st Annual News and Documentary Emmy Awards in the “Outstanding Investigative Documentary” and “Best Documentary” categories. The film also earned a Television Academy Honors Award.

Works

Films 

 2015 - Munich '72 and Beyond - Producer
 2017 - End Game - Executive Producer
 2018 - At the Heart of Gold: Inside the USA Gymnastics Scandal- Producer
 2020 - Positive All the Way - Director and Producer
2021 - Citizen Ashe - Executive Producer
2021 - Waterman - Producer

Books 

 Munich ’72 and Beyond: Based on the Award-Winning Film of Redemption – A Monument of Remembrance (Dunham Books, 2018)

Education 
Ulich graduated from Haverford College in 1981 with a B.A., and he went on to obtain his Juris Doctor 1984 from University of California, Los Angeles, School of Law, where he was a Member of the UCLA Law Review. In 1985 he received an L.L.M. degree from New York University.

Personal 
David Ulich is married to Pamela Conley Ulich, who served as Mayor for the City of Malibu 2009–2010. Together they have two children.

David is the grandson of Robert Ulich, German professor of Philosophy and History of Education at Harvard. David is also stepgrandson of Elsa Brändström, a Swedish nurse and philanthropist, and grandson of Else Ulich-Beil, a German women's rights advocate who was awarded the Grand Cross of Merit in 1961.

Affiliations 
David Ulich is the President of The Foundation for Global Sports Development.  Ulich serves on the LA Sports Council, the International Fair Play Committee Council, and the Southern California Committee for the Olympic Games, and formerly served on the U.S. Olympic and Paralympic Foundation .

Ulich also serves as a board member for LA 2028, and he was a part of the Los Angeles Olympic Bid Committee which successfully won the bid for the 2028 Summer Games.

References

Living people
American film producers
Year of birth missing (living people)